Harrison Eric Muranda (born 20 January 1982) is a Kenyan professional footballer who last played as a forward for Sidama Coffee S.C. in the Ethiopian Premier League. He is currently the trainer at Kenyan Premier League side Kakamega Homeboyz F.C.

Career

Early career
Muranda started his career with Mumias Sugar F.C. of the Kenyan Premier League in 2002 where he scored 13 goals in 18 games. Muranda then went on a run of playing for different clubs at home and abroad.

His first club was Al-Bustan of the Omani League, then Saint George SC of the Ethiopian Premier League, Tusker F.C. back in Kenya, Victory Sports Club of the Dhivehi League, Sporting Afrique FC of the S.League, Nam Định F.C. of the Vietnamese First Division, Hòa Phát Hà Nội F.C., and Sông Lam Nghệ An F.C. of the V.League.

In 2010, Muranda joined Fico Tây Ninh of the Vietnamese First Division where he scored 21 goals in 44 games. He then went back to Kenya where he played for both Posta Rangers F.C. and Nairobi City Stars in the Kenyan Premier League.

On 30 August 2013, Muranda signed for Mohun Bagan A.C. of the Indian I-League after training with the side. He was released from the side on 3 December 2013. From India he returned to Ethiopia where he joined Sidama Coffee S.C.

References

External links
 Malaysia Super League match-report
 Eric Harrison Muranda at Soccerz
 

1982 births
Living people
Kenyan footballers
Tusker F.C. players
Negeri Sembilan FA players
Song Lam Nghe An FC players
Mohun Bagan AC players
Association football forwards
V.League 1 players
Expatriate footballers in Oman
Expatriate footballers in Ethiopia
Expatriate footballers in Singapore
Expatriate footballers in Malaysia
Expatriate footballers in Vietnam
Expatriate footballers in India
Place of birth missing (living people)
Posta Rangers F.C. players
Nairobi City Stars players
Mumias Sugar F.C. players
Kenyan expatriate sportspeople in India